Lingen, officially Lingen (Ems), is a town in Lower Saxony, Germany. In 2008, its population was 52,353, and in addition there were about 5,000 people who registered the city as their secondary residence. Lingen, specifically "Lingen (Ems)" is located on the river Ems in the southern part of the Emsland District, which borders North Rhine-Westphalia in the south and the Netherlands in the west.

History

Lingen was first mentioned in the Middle Ages (975 AD). From 804 to 1180 the region was part of the Duchy of Saxony inside the Carolingian Empire, and then remained part of the german-speaking Holy Roman Empire until 1806. A initially independent county of Lingen (Grafschaft Lingen) was erected in 1388 and remained until 1713, when Prussia took over. In detail though, the county and city in the 17th and 18th were repeatedly conquered by dutch and spanish troops: initially catholic, from 1541 the 1547 the citizens were forced to become lutheran, then the troops of catholic Charles V conquered the county and city and in 1550 gave it to his sister Mary, governor of the Habsburg Netherlands. From 1555 to 1597 Lingen was the easternmost point of the Spanish Empire of Philip II and became part of the Eighty Years' War. From 1597 to 1605 Lingen was conquered by the calvinist and dutch Union of Utrecht, then was reconquered by the catholic spanish troops and from 1632 to 1672 again was part of the calvinist Union of Utrecht. For two years the Prince-Bishopric of Münster had the city, which then from 1674 to 1713 was part of the calvinist Union of Utrecht again, when Frederick I of Prussia inherited the county. From 1807 to 1813 the troops of Napoleon Bonaparte had the region, and from 1810 to 1813 Lingen was part of France. In 1814 it again was part of Prussia, and in 1815 became part of the newly founded kingdom of Hanover. As result of the Austro-Prussian War in 1866 the kingdom of Hanover and also Lingen were annexed by the kingdom of Prussia, and in 1871 became part of the German Empire.

Economy and education
Lingen is known for its offshore- and nuclear industry (Emsland Nuclear Power Plant). The University of Applied Sciences Osnabrueck has set up a branch campus, located in the centre of Lingen, with the three Institutes for Management and Engineering, Communications Management and Teaching of Theatre. In 2000 the institutes in Lingen merged into the Faculty of Society and Technology. In 2010 there are expected to be about 2,000 students attending.

Climate
On 25 July 2019, Lingen set the record for the hottest temperature ever recorded within Germany with a daytime high temperature of 42.6 degrees Celsius (109 degrees Fahrenheit) during a heat wave affecting much of Europe.

Twin towns – sister cities

Lingen is twinned with:
 Bielawa, Poland
 Burton upon Trent, England, United Kingdom
 Elbeuf, France
 Marienberg, Germany
 Salt, Spain

Transport
Lingen (Ems)

Notable people
Eberhard von Danckelmann (1643–1722), Prime Minister of Brandenburg-Prussia from 1692 to 1697
Theodorus Jacobus Frelinghuysen (c.1691–c.1747), German-American Dutch-Reformed minister and theologian
Konrad Beckhaus (1821–1890), Protestant clergyman and botanist
Joseph Rosemeyer (1872–1919), track cyclist, competed at the 1896 Summer Olympics
Hermann Wilhelm Berning (1877–1955), Bishop of Osnabrück in 1914–1955
Herms Niel (1888–1954), composer of military songs and marches, lived and died there
Bernd Rosemeyer (1909–1938), racing car driver
Harry Kramer (1925–1997), sculptor, choreographer, dancer and professor of art 
Beatrix Borchard (born 1950), musicologist and author
Peter van Roye (born 1950), rower
Wilfried Telkämper (born 1953), MEP, Vice President of the European Parliament 1989–1992
Reinhold Hilbers (born 1964), politician (CDU)
Jens Gieseke (born 1971), politician (CDU), Member of the European Parliament
Christian Drosten (born 1972), virologist
Ingo Schultz (born 1975), 400 metres runner
Michael Rensing (born 1984), footballer

References

External links
 
students website 

Towns in Lower Saxony
Emsland